Now I Got Worry is the fifth studio album by Jon Spencer Blues Explosion. It was released via Matador Records on October 15, 1996. "Fuck Shit Up" is a cover of a Dub Narcotic song. "Weird Al" Yankovic directed the music video for "Wail".

Critical reception

Mark Deming of AllMusic gave the album 4 stars out of 5, saying, "Now I Got Worry may not be JSBX's best album, but it does capture their taut, blazing, live sound and their eccentric studio approach with a better balance than anything else in their catalog; if you want to get slapped upside the head while you boogie all night long, this is the album for you."

The album was included in the book 1001 Albums You Must Hear Before You Die.

Track listing

Personnel
Credits adapted from liner notes.

Blues Explosion
 Judah Bauer – guitar, vocals
 Russell Simins – drums
 Jon Spencer – vocals, guitar

Guests
 Mark Ramos Nishita – clarinet (on "Chicken Dog"), piano (on "Can't Stop"), organ (on "Firefly Child")
 Rufus Thomas – vocals (on "Chicken Dog")
 Justin Berry – saxophone (on "Firefly Child")
 Thermos Malling – bang (on "2Kindsa Love" and "Sticky")

Charts

References

External links
 

1996 albums
Jon Spencer Blues Explosion albums
Matador Records albums
Capitol Records albums
Mute Records albums
Au Go Go Records albums